These are the daytime Monday–Friday schedules on all three networks for each calendar season beginning September 1958. All times are Eastern and Pacific. The 1958-1959 season, beginning October 13 for ABC, was its first "full scale daytime programming" schedule.

Talk shows are highlighted in yellow, local programming is white, reruns of prime-time programming are orange, game shows are pink, soap operas are chartreuse, news programs are gold and all others are light blue. New series are highlighted in bold.

Monday-Friday

formerly Do You Trust Your Wife?

Saturday

Sunday

See also
1958-59 United States network television schedule (prime-time)
1958-59 United States network television schedule (late night)

References

Sources
https://web.archive.org/web/20071015122215/http://curtalliaume.com/abc_day.html
https://web.archive.org/web/20071015122235/http://curtalliaume.com/cbs_day.html
https://web.archive.org/web/20071012211242/http://curtalliaume.com/nbc_day.html
Castleman & Podrazik, The TV Schedule Book, McGraw-Hill Paperbacks, 1984
Hyatt, The Encyclopedia Of Daytime Television, Billboard Books, 1997
TV schedules, New York Times, September 1958 – September 1959 (microfilm)

United States weekday network television schedules
1958 in American television
1959 in American television